Pseudelephantopus is a genus of flowering plants in the daisy family described as a genus in 1792.

The genus is monotypic, being represented by the species Pseudelephantopus spicatus, commonly known as dog's-tongue or false elephant's foot. It is native to tropical areas in Mesoamerica, South America, and the West Indies and is naturalized in Florida, mostly on sandy soils.  It has also been introduced to Africa, Southeast Asia, and some islands in the Pacific.

Pseudelephantopus spicatus is a perennial herb spreading by underground rhizomes. Flowers are white to pinkish or purplish.

References

Vernonieae
Monotypic Asteraceae genera
Flora of Florida